Girma Tolla (born 15 October 1975) is an Ethiopian long-distance runner, who specializes in the marathon race, having previously concentrated on the 10,000 metres.

Achievements

Personal bests
3000 metres - 7:42.98 min (1999)
5000 metres - 13:15.72 min (1998)
10,000 metres - 27:13.48 min (1999)
Half marathon - 1:02:06 hrs (2003)
Marathon - 2:10:33 hrs (2004)

External links

1975 births
Living people
Ethiopian male long-distance runners
Ethiopian male marathon runners
Athletes (track and field) at the 2000 Summer Olympics
Olympic athletes of Ethiopia
Ethiopian male cross country runners
20th-century Ethiopian people
21st-century Ethiopian people